The 1940 United States Senate special election in Kentucky took place on November 5, 1940 to complete the unexpired term of M. M. Logan. Interim appointee Happy Chandler was re-elected to complete the term, defeating Republican Walter B. Smith.

Background
Senator M. M. Logan died on October 3, 1939. Governor of Kentucky Happy Chandler, whose term was set to expire in 1940, resigned his office so that Lieutenant Governor (and Democratic nominee for Governor) Keen Johnson could appoint him to the Senate. Johnson appointed Chandler to fill the vacant seat until a successor could be duly elected, and the special election was scheduled for November 5, 1940, concurrent with the general election.

General election

Candidates
Happy Chandler, Governor of Kentucky and candidate for Senate in 1938 (Democratic)
Walter B. Smith (Republican)

Results

See also
1940 United States Senate elections

Notes

References 

1940
Kentucky
United States Senate
Kentucky 1940
Kentucky 1940
United States Senate 1940